Muttichur Kallattupuzha Sri Maha Siva Temple, located in Anthikad in Thrissur district of Kerala. This temple is a classic example of the Kerala style of architecture. Kallattupuzha Temple is situated on the banks of the Karuvannur River and the presiding deity of the temple is Shiva, located in main sanctum sanatorium, facing west. According to folklore, sage Parashurama has installed the idol. The temple is a part of the 108 famous Shiva temples in Kerala.

Koka Sandesam 
Muttichur and Siva Temple is mentioned in "Koka sandesam" poem, which is believed to have been written about 2700 years ago.

See also
Temples of Kerala

References

108 Shiva Temples
Shiva temples in Kerala
Hindu temples in Thrissur district